Epomophorus (epauletted bat) is a genus of bat in the family Pteropodidae. They have a distribution throughout Africa.

Species
Epomophorus contains the following species:

Genus Epomophorus
 Angolan epauletted fruit bat, Epomophorus angolensis
 Ansell's epauletted fruit bat, Epomophorus anselli
 Peters's epauletted fruit bat, Epomophorus crypturus
 Dobson's epauletted fruit bat, Epomophorus dobsonii
 Gambian epauletted fruit bat, Epomophorus gambianus
 Lesser Angolan epauletted fruit bat, Epomophorus grandis
 Ethiopian epauletted fruit bat, Epomophorus labiatus
 East African epauletted fruit bat, Epomophorus minimus
 Minor epauletted fruit bat, Epomophorus minor
 Wahlberg's epauletted fruit bat, Epomophorus wahlbergi

References

Further reading
Taxonomy Browser
Encyclopedia of Life 

 
Bat genera
Taxa named by Edward Turner Bennett
Taxonomy articles created by Polbot